João de Fontes Pereira de Melo (25 January 1780 – 28 October 1856) was a Portuguese politician and a general in the 19th century. He was colonial governor of Cape Verde and Minister of the Maritime and Overseas. 

He served two terms as colonial governor of Cape Verde: from 1839 to 1842, and from 28 June 1848 to 23 August 1851. From 22 August to 18 December 1847, he was the Maritime and Overseas minister under the Duke of Saldanha. He succeeded João Gualberto de Oliveira (the Count of Tojal) and was succeeded by Agostinho Albano. He was the father of the Portuguese prime minister António Maria de Fontes Pereira de Melo.

See also
List of colonial governors of Cape Verde
History of Cape Verde

References

1797 births
1885 deaths
People from Elvas
Colonial heads of Cape Verde
Portuguese colonial governors and administrators
Naval ministers of Portugal